6P62 (6П62) is the GRAU designation of a Russian handheld machine gun chambered for the 12.7×108mm round. Its project code name is unknown.

It is a large-frame automatic rifle with a short barrel and a folding bipod. It has a large compensating muzzle-brake on the end of the barrel to reduce the muzzle-flash, sound and recoil of the heavy round to manageable levels. All demonstrations used iron sights, as it is meant to be used at short ranges.          

Its purpose was to provide close anti-vehicle support at a strongpoint or roadblock, where engagement range is too close for grenade launchers or rocket launchers. It would also be easier to transport and quicker to set up than a heavy machinegun or automatic-grenade launcher emplacement. Its most effective use would be by military police and border guards at checkpoints. It could also be used by assault troops to take and hold vital transport junctions like crossroads and bridges while waiting to be relieved by follow-on troops. 

The weapon was never actually adopted by a military force. While a good theory, it would not be very practical. The weapon would be a burden on the squad that would be assigned it, would slow down movement on foot, and would be rarely used. If they did encounter a light armored vehicle, the weapon would be able to get them into trouble and might not get them out of it. It is also trying to perform a task that is already filled by anti-materiel rifles and disposable anti-tank rockets.

See also
 List of Russian weaponry

References

12.7×108 mm anti-materiel rifles
Gas-operated firearms
Modern military equipment of Russia
Trial and research firearms of Russia